The Bummerlhaus is a gothic building in Steyr, Austria. It is the best preserved late Gothic mansion in Steyr, and is one of the finest medieval secular buildings in Austria.  The oldest part of the building dates from the thirteenth century, and it is first mentioned in documents dating from 1450.

The house is a typical Steyr design, consisting of a richly decorated façade facing the square, behind which lies the house and three courtyards with arcades. It has a steep hipped roof. The façade facing the square on the first floor has a cantilevered, stone carved, wide bay window, which spans the entire elevation, adorned with blind arcades and a rich frieze with quatrefoil tracery, among which the five windows are placed asymmetrically. Above the narrow roof of the wide bay window rises a brick gable wall with blind arches of brick.

The name of the house (Bummerl meaning to this time "plump little dog") stems from its onetime seal from its days as an inn that contained a lion the people of Steyr jokingly said looked like a dog.

Notes

Houses completed in the 13th century
Houses in Austria
Gothic architecture in Austria
13th century in Austria
Buildings and structures in Upper Austria
Tourist attractions in Upper Austria